Youth Film Handbook (青年电影手册) is a Chinese magazine established by film critic/screenwriter/director Cheng Qingsong (程青松) in 2007, featuring independent film reviews and interviews. It is best known for handing out its annual "Golden Broom Awards" (金扫帚奖), highlighting the most disappointing films of the year.

Awards for Excellence in Chinese-language films

Top-10 Films

2009
Cannot Live Without You
Spring Fever
24 City
The Clear Water
Yang Yang
Hear Me
Vengeance
Night and Fog
Cow
Crazy Racer
2010
Let the Bullets Fly
Buddha Mountain
Monga
Echoes of the Rainbow
Chongqing Blues
When Love Comes
The Fourth Portrait
Taipei Exchanges
Love in a Puff
Lost on Journey
2011
A Simple Life
Seediq Bale
The Piano in a Factory
Love for Life
Folk Song Singing
Mr. Tree
Life Without Principle
You Are the Apple of My Eye
Eternal Watch
Starry Starry Night

2012
Mystery
11 Flowers
People Mountain People Sea
Feng Shui
Lost in Thailand
The Grandmaster
Cold War
Girlfriend, Boyfriend
Touch of the Light
Together
2013
Stray Dogs
A Touch of Sin
Ilo Ilo
China Affair
All Apologies
The Love Songs of Tiedan
Don't Expect Praises
Fly with the Crane
Soul
Rigor Mortis
2014
Blind Massage
Ice Poison
Brotherhood of Blades
Black Coal, Thin Ice
Gone with the Bullets
Paradise in Service
Forgetting to Know You
Exit
Aberdeen
The Midnight After

2015
Red Amnesia
Port of Call
Mountains May Depart
Thanatos, Drunk
A Fool
The Master
I Am Somebody
The Assassin
River Road
Zinnia Flower
2016
Tharlo
The Road to Mandalay
Kaili Blues
Mad World
Mr. Donkey
Crosscurrent
Trivisa
Godspeed

Individual Awards

Golden Broom Awards

Most Disappointing Films

2009
A Simple Noodle Story
City of Life and Death
The Treasure Hunter
2010
Confucius
Just Call Me Nobody
If You Are the One 2
2011
The Warring States
Legendary Amazons
The Lost Bladesman
2012
The Guillotines
The Last Supper

2013
Tiny Times & Tiny Times 2
Switch
Personal Tailor
2014
The White Haired Witch of Lunar Kingdom
Tiny Times 3
The Breakup Guru
2015
Oh My God
Devil and Angel
Forever Young
2016
League of Gods
From Vegas to Macau III
See You Tomorrow

2017
Buddies in India
Once Upon a Time
Pure Hearts: Into Chinese Showbiz
2018
Love Apartment
The Faces of My Gene
Hello, Mrs. Money
2019
Shanghai Fortress
Jade Dynasty
Always Miss You
2020
The Story of Hay Bo (2020)
Wild Grass
Oversize Love

Individual Awards

References

2007 establishments in China
Film magazines published in China
Magazines established in 2007